Chã de Tanque is a town in the west-central part of the island of Santiago, Cape Verde. It is part of the municipality of Santa Catarina. In 2010 its population was 1,164. It is situated 4 km west of Assomada, on the road to Rincão. The elevation is about 260 meters above sea level. Since 2008, it is home to the Museu da Tabanca.

Notable person
Gil Semedo, singer

References

Geography of Santiago, Cape Verde
Santa Catarina, Cape Verde
Towns in Cape Verde